Literary Review is a British literary magazine founded in 1979 by Anne Smith, then head of the Department of English at the University of Edinburgh. Its offices are on Lexington Street in Soho. The magazine was edited for fourteen years by veteran journalist Auberon Waugh. The current editor is Nancy Sladek.

The magazine reviews a wide range of published books, including fiction, history, politics, biography and travel, and additionally prints new fiction. It is also known for the annual Bad Sex in Fiction Award that it has run since 1993.

Bad Sex in Fiction Award
Each year since 1993, Literary Review has presented the annual Bad Sex in Fiction Award to the author it deems to have produced the worst description of a sex scene in a novel. The award is symbolically presented in the form of what has been described as a "semi-abstract trophy representing sex in the 1950s", depicting a naked woman draped over an open book. The award was established by Rhoda Koenig, a literary critic, and Auberon Waugh, then the magazine's editor.

The aim of the award is "to draw attention to the crude, tasteless, often perfunctory use of redundant passages of sexual description in the modern novel, and to discourage it". The enduring relevance of this rationale has been questioned, based on concerns about censorious public shaming (including online) of authors of serious literary fiction.

Winners

 1993: Melvyn Bragg, A Time to Dance
 1994: Philip Hook, The Stonebreakers
 1995: Philip Kerr, Gridiron
 1996: David Huggins, The Big Kiss: An Arcade Mystery
 1997: Nicholas Royle, The Matter of the Heart
 1998: Sebastian Faulks, Charlotte Gray
 1999: A. A. Gill, Starcrossed
 2000: Sean Thomas, Kissing England
 2001: Christopher Hart, Rescue Me
 2002: Wendy Perriam, Tread Softly
 2003: Aniruddha Bahal, Bunker 13
 2004: Tom Wolfe, I Am Charlotte Simmons
 2005: Giles Coren, Winkler
 2006: Iain Hollingshead, Twenty Something
 2007: Norman Mailer, The Castle in the Forest
 2008: Rachel Johnson, Shire Hell; John Updike, Lifetime Achievement Award
 2009: Jonathan Littell, The Kindly Ones
 2010: Rowan Somerville, The Shape of Her
 2011: David Guterson, Ed King
 2012: Nancy Huston, Infrared
 2013: Manil Suri, The City of Devi
 2014: Ben Okri, The Age of Magic
 2015: Morrissey, List of the Lost
 2016: Erri De Luca, The Day Before Happiness
 2017: Christopher Bollen, The Destroyers
 2018: James Frey, Katerina
 2019: Didier Decoin, The Office of Gardens and Ponds and John Harvey, Pax
 2020: Not awarded, citing that people have been "subjected to too many bad things this year" already.

Contributors
Contributors to the magazine have included Diana Athill, Kingsley Amis, Martin Amis, Beryl Bainbridge, John Banville, Julian Barnes, Maile Chapman, Boris Dralyuk, Hilary Mantel, John Mortimer, Malcolm Bradbury, A. S. Byatt, Paul Johnson, David Starkey, John Gray, Robert Harris, Nick Hornby, Richard Ingrams, Joseph O'Neill, Lynn Barber, Derek Mahon, Oleg Gordievsky, John Sutherland and D. J. Taylor.  Recently published authors of new fiction include William Trevor, Claire Keegan and Nicola Barker.

References

External links
 
 Literary Review's Bad Sex in Fiction Award
 Compendium of winners

1979 establishments in the United Kingdom
Book review magazines
Literary magazines published in the United Kingdom
Magazines established in 1979
Magazines published in London